Mariia Sergeyevna Cherepanova (born August 28, 1987) is a Russian basketball player for UMMC Ekaterinburg and the Russian national team.

She participated at the 2015 European Games, winning a gold medal, EuroBasket Women 2017. and EuroBasket Women 2021. She qualified for the 2020 Summer Olympics, playing in a team with Olga Frolkina, Yulia Kozik and Anastasia Logunova in the 3×3 tournament.

References

1987 births
Living people
Russian women's basketball players
Sportspeople from Izhevsk
Small forwards
European Games gold medalists for Russia
Basketball players at the 2015 European Games
European Games medalists in basketball